East Mount Barren is a quartzite peak of the Barren Range in Fitzgerald River National Park. It was sighted and named by explorer Matthew Flinders on 6 January 1802, together with two other peaks in the range, West Mount Barren and Middle Mount Barren. All were named because of their barren appearance.

Plant species that are endemic to East Barren Mountain and its immediate environs include Calothamnus macrocarpus, Eucalyptus burdettiana (Burdett gum), Kunzea similis subsp. similis, Regelia velutina (Barrens regelia) and Verticordia pityrhops. Other species of note include Acacia argutifolia (East Barrens wattle),  Adenanthos ellipticus (oval-leaf adenanthos), Anthocercis fasciculata, Banksia speciosa (showy banksia), Dampiera deltoidea, Eucalyptus coronata (crowned mallee), Gonocarpus hispidus, Hakea hookerana, Hibbertia papillata, Jacksonia compressa, Leptospermum confertum, Leucopogon compactus, Melaleuca papillosa, Pimelea physodes (Qualup bell) and Stylidium galioides (yellow mountain triggerplant).

References

Mountains of Western Australia
Great Southern (Western Australia)